Harriet Tubman Elementary School is a public elementary school, named after Harriet Tubman, an African-American abolitionist, humanitarian, and Union spy during the U.S. Civil War. It is located in Washington, DC and is under the jurisdiction of the District of Columbia Public Schools. Over five hundred students are currently enrolled from pre-school to fifth grade.

History 
Harriet Tubman Elementary School was built in 1970, shortly after the 1968 Washington, D.C. riots which ravaged its neighborhood of Columbia Heights.

Programs and students 
The school has regular graffiti cleaning, students have received free dental care, and D.C. Discovery Days give them field trips out of the neighborhood. Nevertheless, in 2007 a student from Tubman joined others in voicing concern over safety in the public school district. 85% of the student body qualify for free or reduced-price lunches.

Awards and recognition 

Former principal Sadia M. White won a National Distinguished Principals award in 2004 for her work at Tubman. According to National Association of Elementary School Principals, under White, Tubman Elementary met all its goals for standardized test scores and White supervised the launch of an inclusion-teaching model featuring team-teaching by general education, special education teachers, and teachers of new English-language learners. The association also commended her institution of a comprehensive school-wide positive-approach discipline program that included a due process system for punishment referrals and intervention strategies for classroom teachers for preventing problems.

On November 27, 2001, First Lady Laura Bush hosted Tubman Elementary students at the White House for a screening of the film, Twice Upon a Christmas.

In 2005, Cory Chimka, fourth grade teacher at Harriet Tubman, was named National Kind Teacher of the Year by the National Association for Humane & Environmental Education.

Notes

Further reading 

Profile of Tubman Elementary from the Washington Post

External links 
School website

District of Columbia Public Schools
Harriet Tubman
Public elementary schools in Washington, D.C.
Educational institutions established in 1970